The TESS-Keck Survey or TKS is an exoplanet search project that uses the Keck I and the Automated Planet Finder (APF) to conduct ground-based follow-up of planet candidates discovered by the Transiting Exoplanet Survey Satellite. The TKS aims to measure the mass for about 100 exoplanets and has been awarded some of the largest time allocations in the histories of Keck I and APF. The program has four main science themes:

 the bulk compositions of small planets
 dynamical temperatures and system architectures
 a larger, more refined sample for future atmospheric studies
 planets orbiting evolved stars

List of discoveries 

Follow-up works by TKS studied the already discovered planets TOI-1726 c and WASP-107b.

References 

Exoplanet search projects